A Marvada Carne is a 1985 Brazilian romantic comedy film directed by André Klotzel and starring Fernanda Torres, Adilson Barros and Regina Casé.

Cast 
Adilson Barros	...	Quim
Fernanda Torres	...	Carula
Dionísio Azevedo	...	Nhô Totó
Geny Prado	...	Nhá Policena
Lucélia Maquiavelli	...	Nhá Tomasa
Nelson Triunfo	...	Curupira
Regina Casé	...	Mulher Diaba
Paco Sanches	...	Serafim

Awards
13th Gramado Film Festival

Best Picture  
Best Actress (Fernanda Torres)
Best Screenplay (André Klotzel and CA Sofredini)
Best Director (André Klotzel)
Best Cinematography (Pedro Farkas)
Best Editing (Alain Fresnot)
Best Set Design (Adrian Cooper) 
Best Original Music (Rogério Duprat)

References

External links 
A Marvada Carne on IMDb

Brazilian romantic comedy films
1985 films
1980s Portuguese-language films
1985 romantic comedy films